Book of Days is the eleventh studio album by progressive rock band Nektar, released in 2008.  It saw the departure of founding keyboardist Taff Freeman, leaving only two original band members in guitarist/frontman Roye Albrighton and drummer Ron Howden.

Track listing

Personnel

Roye Albrighton – Guitars, Lead Vocals
Ron Howden – Drums, Backing Vocals
Steve Adams – Guitars, Backing Vocals
Steve Mattern – Hammond Organ, Keyboards
Desha Dunnahoe – Bass, Backing Vocals

2008 albums
Nektar albums